The Freeman Courier is a weekly newspaper serving the larger Freeman, South Dakota community. Located on the eastern edge of Hutchinson County, the Courier’s primary readership includes eastern Hutchinson, western Turner and southern McCook counties. The paper offers both print and online subscriptions. Through its website, freemansd.com, Freeman Courier, as well as other social media platforms, the weekly provides the community with regular news updates to supplement the Thursday print publication.

The Courier was established in 1901. The following year, Jacob J. Mendel became the editor and he owned the weekly until 1960 when he sold the Courier to brothers Glenn and Vernon Gering. The Gerings published the Courier until 1984 when they sold it to Tim L. Waltner and his wife, Mary. Their son, Jeremy Waltner, began working in the business as a jr. high student and, after studying journalism at South Dakota State University in Brookings, SD, became news editor in 1999. The Waltners established Second Century Publishing Inc., in 2001, reflecting the acquisition of other publications including the Hutchinson Herald, the weekly serving the neighboring town and Hutchinson County communities of Menno and Olivet. Jeremy and his wife, Stacey, joined the ownership team and became publishers in 2016. In July 2019, publication of the Hutchinson Herald as a separate newspaper ended and the Courier expanded its coverage to include the Menno and Olivet communities.

The business also includes two advertising publications — the Area Wide Connection and the Dakota Action Rocket — and Waltner Media + Studios, which offers photography/graphic design/printing and online services.

The Freeman Courier is a member of the South Dakota Newspaper Association, the National Newspaper Association, and the International Society of Weekly Newspaper Editors and has won journalism awards from all three organizations.

External links

Freeman Courier
South Dakota Newspaper Association
National Newspaper Association|
International Society of Weekly Newspaper Editors|

Newspapers published in South Dakota
Hutchinson County, South Dakota